The 7th Standing Committee of the National Assembly of Laos was elected by the 1st Session of the 7th National Assembly on 15 June 2011 and was replaced by the 8th Standing Committee on 20 April 2016.

Government

References

Specific

Bibliography
Books:
 

7th Standing Committee of the National Assembly of Laos
2011 establishments in Laos
2016 disestablishments in Laos